Saudi Aramco's Qatif Project is an oilfield development project in Qatif, Eastern Province, Saudi Arabia, operated by the country's national oil company Saudi Aramco.

Qatif Producing Plants
The Qatif Producing Plants are the largest crude increment built in recent times, and the world's largest crude production facility. The completion of the project added  to the  already produced from the Abu Safah field.

Production
The Qatif Producing Plants produce:
 of crude oil, 500,000 coming from Qatif field, and 300,000 from Abu Safah offshore
 of associated natural gas. 
 of high-value hydrocarbon condensate. 
1,800 metric tons of sulfur per day.

Technology
The project took three million man-hours to design and 70 million man-hours to construct. It brought with it the latest technological advancements to increase operational efficiency as well as environmental safety. This ranged from an onshore smokeless flare system, to a 99 percent effective sulfur recovery system at the Berri Gas Plant that uses technology to make it the cleanest operating plant of all Saudi Aramco facilities. The Berri gas plant was expanded by Technip. 

The gas and oil separation plant (GOSP) was constructed by CB&I.

Qatif Field

The field development services were provided by Halliburton.

References

Oil fields of Saudi Arabia
Eastern Province, Saudi Arabia
Petroleum production
Saudi Aramco
Qatif